Kim Kkobbi (born November 24, 1985) is a South Korean actress. The syllables of her given name literally mean "flower" and "rain".

Career
Kim Kkobbi was working as an extra on the 2001 film My Boss, My Hero when a staffer spotted her and asked her to audition for Jealousy Is My Middle Name. Thus began her acting career, though for many years she was relegated to bit parts. Instead she focused on gaining experience in the indie film scene.

Kim had her breakthrough in 2009 when she starred opposite actor-director Yang Ik-june in the gritty, low-budget drama Breathless. The film won critical acclaim both at home and abroad, receiving more than 20 awards from the international festival circuit, and attracting audiences to theaters in numbers unprecedented for an indie film. Kim was widely praised for her portrayal of a spunky high school girl with an abusive past who bonds with a neighborhood thug, earning her a Best Actress award from the Las Palmas de Gran Canaria International Film Festival, Best New Actress honors from the Blue Dragon Film Awards and Grand Bell Awards, and a Best Supporting Actress nomination from the Asian Film Awards.

Kim's other notable films include the vacation island mystery Magic and Loss, the lesbian romance Ashamed (also known as Life is Peachy), the dark and violent animated film The King of Pigs, and Myselves: The Actress No Make-Up Project, for which she and two other indie actresses filmed themselves using camcorders to document their lives, struggles and dreams. In 2014 she played the leading role in the Japanese horror film A Record of Sweet Murder.

Filmography

Theater

Awards and nominations

References

External links
 
 
 
 
 

1985 births
Living people
South Korean film actresses
South Korean stage actresses